Stibaera is a genus of moths of the family Noctuidae. The genus was erected by Francis Walker in 1857.

Species
 Stibaera albisparsana Hampson, 1926
 Stibaera costiplaga Walker, 1857
 Stibaera curvilineata Hampson, 1924
 Stibaera dentilineata Hampson, 1926
 Stibaera hersilia (H. Druce, 1889)
 Stibaera minor Draudt & Gaede, 1944
 Stibaera myrina (Möschler, 1880)
 Stibaera thyatiroides (Barnes & Benjamin, 1924)

References

Condicinae